Woland is a fictional character in the novel The Master and Margarita by the Russian (Soviet) author Mikhail Bulgakov, written between 1928 and 1940. Woland is the mysterious foreigner and professor whose visit to Moscow sets the plot rolling and turns the world upside-down.

His demonic retinue, which includes witches, vampires, and a gigantic talking cat, his role in the plot, and the fact that Voland is a (now outdated) German word for a devil or evil spirit, all imply that he is, in fact, the Devil. More controversial interpretations see him as the Apostle Peter (based on Jesus’ remark to Peter, "Get thee behind me, Satan") or even the Second Coming of Christ.

Edward Ericson argues that Woland is essentially "the Satan of orthodox (specifically Russian Orthodox) Christian theology [...] He is both a tempter of men and an unwitting instrument of divine justice, a being who owes his existence and power to the very one he opposes."

In conceiving of Woland, Bulgakov draws heavily from the figure of Mephistopheles in Goethe's Faust, a connection made explicit by the use of an epigraph from the poem at the beginning of the novel. Additionally, the name Woland itself is derived from a name by which Mephistopheles refers to himself during the Walpurgisnacht scene: squire Voland. Other allusions to Goethe's Mephistopheles include Woland's cane with the head of a poodle and his limp. Another influence on Woland is Charles Gounod's opera Faust.

In adaptations
Veniamin Smekhov played him in a Moscow stage adaptation.
In the 1972 Italian-Yugoslavian adaptation, Il maestro e Margherita, Woland was played by French actor Alain Cuny.
In the 1990 Polish TV series, Mistrz i Malgorzata, Woland was played by Gustaw Holoubek.
In the 1994 Russian adaptation, Master i Margarita, Woland was played by Valentin Gaft.
In the 2005 miniseries adaptation, Woland was played by Oleg Basilashvili.
In the upcoming 2023 Russian film Woland, the eponymous part will be played by August Diehl.

Quotations
  "Forgive me, but I don't believe you. That cannot be: manuscripts don't burn." - To the Master

  "Yes, man is mortal, but that would be only half the trouble. The worst of it is that he's sometimes unexpectedly mortal—there's the trick!" - To Berlioz

References
Notes

Works Cited

Characters in fantasy literature
Characters in Russian novels of the 20th century
Mikhail Bulgakov characters
Fictional demons and devils
Male literary villains
Literary characters introduced in 1966
Devils
Comedy literature characters